St. Stephen's Anglican Church is a church in Chambly, Quebec affiliated with the Anglican Church of Canada.

It was built in 1820 to serve the garrison of Fort Chambly as well as the Loyalist and English settler population in and around Chambly. It served both soldiers and civilians until the troops departed in 1869.

St. Stephen's Anglican Church was listed as a National Historic Site of Canada in February 1970. The Historic and Monuments Board of Canada cited it as an outstanding example of early 19th-century Canadian ecclesiastical architecture. It is located in close proximity to the Fort Chambly National Historic Site of Canada, the Richelieu River and the Chambly Canal.

References

External links
Official website

Chambly, Quebec
Anglican church buildings in Quebec
Churches in Montérégie
Churches completed in 1820
19th-century Anglican church buildings in Canada
National Historic Sites in Quebec
Palladian Revival architecture in Canada